Annunciation is a 1491 tempera on panel painting by Luca Signorelli, signed by the artist. It is now in the Pinacoteca e museo civico in Volterra.

References

1491 paintings
Signorelli
Paintings by Luca Signorelli
Paintings in the Pinacoteca e museo civico di Volterra